Madhouse is a 1974 British-American horror film directed by Jim Clark for Amicus Productions in association with American International Pictures. It stars Vincent Price, Natasha Pyne, Peter Cushing, Robert Quarry, Adrienne Corri, and Linda Hayden. The film was based on the 1969 novel Devilday by Angus Hall. The film's alternate title is The Revenge of Dr. Death.

Plot
Paul Toombes is a successful horror actor whose trademark role is Dr. Death, a skull-faced killer. During a party in Hollywood showing off his fifth Dr. Death film, he announces his engagement to Ellen Mason, who gives him an engraved watch as an engagement gift. Later that evening, however, adult film producer Oliver Quayle reveals Ellen had worked for him previously, in adult films, and had also slept with him. Distraught at Toombes' angry reaction, Ellen returns to her room, where a masked man in dark garb, similar to Dr. Death's attire, approaches her with a knife. An apologetic Toombes comes in shortly after, only for her severed head to fall from her shoulders when he touches her. Though he is acquitted of the crime, Toombes' career is destroyed as he spends several years in a mental hospital, where even he is not sure whether he killed Ellen or not.

Twelve years later, Toombes is called to London by his friend, screenwriter Herbert Flay, who has partnered with Quayle to produce a Dr. Death television series for the BBC. While on the cruise ship en route to England, Toombes encounters a persistent young actress, who steals his watch and follows him through London and eventually to Flay's house. In the spider-infested basement, Toombes discovers Faye Carstairs, the former female lead in one of the Dr. Death movies and now Flay's wife, driven mad after being disfigured in a car accident. She treats the spiders as pets. Outside Flay's house, the young actress discovers the masked, caped figure walking the grounds; believing it to be Toombes, she approaches him, and is killed with a pitchfork. When her body is discovered, Scotland Yard suspects Toombes, as the killing resembles a scene from one of his films.

Unimpressed to find that Quayle has given Dr. Death an "assistant" for the TV series, which he never had in the films, Toombes berates his female co-star on set for her performance; she is soon found hanged by her hair, another scene from a Dr. Death film. Scotland Yard questions him but finds no conclusive evidence. Toombes is harassed by the parents of the actress from the cruise ship, who have found the watch that was stolen from Toombes. They threaten to deliver the watch to the police unless he pays them a ransom. However, the masked man lures them into the house and impales them both with a broadsword. Faye discovers the bodies and is horrified. On the set, the series director is crushed by a descending bed canopy in a trap intended for Toombes. Later, Toombes is chased through the BBC studio by the masked man while on his way to an interview. Julia Wilson, Quayle's public relations chief, discovers a contract in Quayle's files, but is killed by the masked man; Toombes discovers her body in a replication of the death of Ellen, seated in front of her dressing table. A distraught Toombes carries Julia's body to the set, turns the camera on, and sets the place ablaze.

Believing Toombes to have died in the fire, Flay signs a contract to take his place as Dr. Death. Later he watches the reel of film from Toombes' studio "death" in his home – only to see Toombes seemingly walk out of the screen, burned but alive. When Toombes demands to know why Flay wishes to destroy him, Flay rages that he had written the Dr. Death role for himself, but was passed over in favour of Toombes; he murdered Ellen to frame Toombes in the hopes of destroying his career but was still not given the role. He then reveals that the contract that Julia had discovered stipulated that if Toombes died, Flay would take over the role of Dr. Death by right. The two struggle into the basement, where Faye enters and stabs Flay in the back. He falls into a tank of spiders and they devour his flesh. Toombes applies makeup to his burn-scarred face, now looking similar to Flay, and sits down to dinner with Faye. Faye says she has made Paul his favourite meal—sour cream and "red herrings"—and they both laugh.

Cast

 Vincent Price as Paul Toombes.
 Peter Cushing as Herbert Flay
 Adrienne Corri as Faye Carstairs Flay
 Robert Quarry as Oliver Quayle
 Natasha Pyne as Julia Wilson
 Michael Parkinson as T.V. Interviewer
 Linda Hayden as Elizabeth Peters
 Barry Dennen as Gerry Blount
 Ellis Dale as Alfred Peters
 Catherine Willmer as Louise Peters
 John Garrie as Inspector Harper
 Ian Thompson as Bradshaw
 Jenny Lee-Wright as Carol Clayton
 Julie Crosthwait as Ellen Mason
 Peter Halliday as Psychiatrist

The title credits mention "special participation" by Basil Rathbone and Boris Karloff, who had died in 1967 and 1969, respectively; the film included scenes in which they had appeared with Vincent Price from previous AIP films (Rathbone from Tales of Terror [1962], Karloff from The Raven [1963]). Other AIP films starring Price that had scenes played in the film include The Haunted Palace, The Pit and the Pendulum, Scream and Scream Again, and House of Usher.

Production 
American International Pictures purchased the rights to Angus Hall's novel Devilday in 1970. Although Robert Fuest was originally named as director, in 1973 Jim Clark was signed to direct and filming began at London's Twickenham Studios.

Release

The film opened in Los Angeles in December 1974.

Box office
The film performed considerably less well at the box office than other horror movies Price had made for AIP and Samuel Z. Arkoff considered it marked the end of the horror cycle.

Critical reception

Author and film critic Leonard Maltin awarded the film 3/4 stars, calling it "Good, if somewhat unimaginative". Time Out gave the film a mostly positive review, noting its tendency to go over-the-top, but commended the film's interweaving of Price's character Toombes with the actor's actual film career, and "reasonably witty in its use of inter-penetrating fantasies born of the Dream Factory". Dennis Schwartz from Ozus' World Movie Reviews awarded the film a grade B−, calling it, "Cheesy but enjoyable".

Not all reviews have been positive, TV Guide awarded the film 1/5 stars, writing, "With its behind-the-scenes setting and focus on an aging star whose glory days are behind him, this could have been a wonderful elegy to the twilight of Price's long career. Unfortunately, the script and direction simply aren't up to the task, and the film becomes an inferior spin-off of Dr. Phibes series. Not even the interaction between Price and Cushing--two very different actors--manages to generate much interest, leaving the clips from Price's Corman-AIP films the best part of the movie." John Stanley also gives it a negative review:: "Sleazy spooker filmed in London...about a hammy actor (Vincent Price) suspected of committing gore murders during the filming of a TV series. The climax is so unbelievable and forced even horror fans will wonder what's happening. Made by the kind of mentality that thinks the sight of a spider is the height of horror. Eeeekkkkk!"

References

External links

 
 
 
 

1974 films
1974 horror films
British crime thriller films
British horror films
American horror thriller films
American mystery films
Amicus Productions films
Films about actors
Films based on British novels
Films based on horror novels
Films scored by Douglas Gamley
Mariticide in fiction
British serial killer films
British slasher films
British psychological horror films
British exploitation films
1970s English-language films
1970s American films
1970s British films